Thorius narismagnus is a species of salamander in the family Plethodontidae. It is endemic to the San Martin Tuxtla volcano, in the Sierra de los Tuxtlas range in southern Veracruz state, Mexico. Its common name is San Martin pigmy salamander. Natural habitats of Thorius narismagnus are lowland and intermediate tropical forests. It occurs under rotten logs and among leaf-litter, and especially under fallen bromeliads.

This species had not been seen since 1970s, until it was rediscovered in 2012. It has suffered from habitat loss, but this might not suffice to explain the disappearance of this species.

References

narismagnus
Endemic amphibians of Mexico
Endemic fauna of Los Tuxtlas
Taxonomy articles created by Polbot
Amphibians described in 1955